is a Japanese biathlete. She was born in Hokkaido. She competed at the 2014 Winter Olympics in Sochi, in the individual and sprint competitions.

References

1990 births
Living people
Biathletes at the 2014 Winter Olympics
Biathletes at the 2018 Winter Olympics
Japanese female biathletes
Olympic biathletes of Japan
Biathletes at the 2017 Asian Winter Games
21st-century Japanese women